The 1962 West Texas State Buffaloes football team was an American football team that represented West Texas State College (now known as West Texas A&M University) as an independent during the 1962 NCAA University Division football season. In its third season under head coach Joe Kerbel, the team compiled a 9–2 record, defeated Ohio in the 1962 Sun Bowl, and outscored all opponents by a total of 312 to 115. The team played its home games at the Buffalo Bowl (later renamed Kimbrough Memorial Stadium) in Canyon, Texas.

On offense, the team averaged 28.4 points per game, ranking fourth among 120 major college programs for the 1962 season. On defense, the team intercepted 25 passes and totaled 529 interception return years, both of which remain school records. Jerry Logan's 99-yard interception return against Arizona State on October 13, 1962, also remains a school record.

The team's statistical leaders included Jim Dawson with 652 passing yards, Pete Pedro with 831 rushing yards, Jerry Richardson with 22 receptions and 282 receiving yards, and Jerry Logan with 13 touchdowns.

Schedule

References

West Texas State
West Texas A&M Buffaloes football seasons
West Texas State Buffaloes football